The BBC Radio 4 programme Desert Island Discs invites castaways to choose eight pieces of music, a book (in addition to the Bible – or a religious text appropriate to that person's beliefs – and the Complete Works of Shakespeare) and a luxury item that they would take to an imaginary desert island, where they will be marooned indefinitely. The rules state that the chosen luxury item must not be anything animate or indeed anything that enables the castaway to escape from the island, for instance a radio set, sailing yacht or aeroplane. The choices of book and luxury can sometimes give insight into the guest's life, and the choices of guests between 1981 and 1990 are listed here.

1981

1982

1983

1984

1985

1986

1987

1988

1989

1990

Episodes (1981-1990)
Lists of British radio series episodes
1980s in the United Kingdom
1980s in British music
1990s in the United Kingdom
1990s in British music